The Bērziņš cabinet was the government of Latvia from 5 May 2000 until 7 November 2002.

Cabinets of Latvia
2000 establishments in Latvia
2001 in Latvia
2002 disestablishments in Latvia
Cabinets established in 2000
Cabinets disestablished in 2002